The Port of Decatur is a transshipment port on the Tennessee River, in the city of Decatur, Alabama, United States of America. The port was founded in 1971.

Port facilities 

The port is directly connected to the Norfolk Southern and CSX railroads and to interstate and regional highway networks.

Industries 
Port throughput is dominated by imports of industrial and agricultural commodities including sand, asphalt, grains and fertilizers, coal, and steel piping. From 2005 the port also began handling poultry feed products for nationwide poultry firm Golden Kist.

Exports are limited by the cost-efficiency of road and rail distribution networks, forcing many barges accessing the port to return empty. Shipping times to New Orleans are approximately two weeks from loading.

See also

Decatur, Alabama
List of North American ports

References

External links

Decatur metropolitan area, Alabama
Huntsville-Decatur, AL Combined Statistical Area
Decatur
Decatur
River ports of the United States
Decatur
Industrial parks in the United States
1971 establishments in Alabama